USS Detroit (CL-8) was an  light cruiser, originally classified as a scout cruiser, of the United States Navy. She was the fourth Navy ship named for the city of Detroit, Michigan. She spent her first eight years as part of the Scouting Fleet either in the Atlantic or Mediterranean. Her first duty was to assist in the USAAS's first aerial circumnavigation of the world in 1924 and transported the United States Secretary of State Frank B. Kellogg, in 1927, from Ireland to France for the negotiations that led to the signing of the Kellogg-Briand Pact. In 1931 she joined the Battle Force, where her home port was San Diego until moving to Pearl Harbor in 1941. Detroit was moored next to her sister  when the Japanese attacked on the morning of 7 December 1941.

Built in Quincy, Massachusetts
Detroit ordered 4 March 1917 with the contract being awarded to Bethlehem Shipbuilding Corporation's Fore River Shipyard in Quincy, Massachusetts, on 21 August 1917. She was laid down on 10 November 1920 and launched 29 June 1922. Her sponsor was Miss M. Couzens, daughter of James J. Couzens, the Mayor of Detroit, Michigan. Detroit was commissioned on 31 July 1923, with Captain J. Halligan, Jr. in command.

Her crew, during peace time, consisted of 29 officers and 429 enlisted men.

Detroit was powered by four Curtis steam turbines geared steam turbines, each driving one screw, using steam generated by 12 Yarrow boilers.

Detroits main armament went through many changes while she was being designed. Originally she was to mount ten /53 caliber guns; two on either side at the waist, with the remaining eight mounted in tiered casemates on either side of the fore and aft superstructures. After America's entry into World War I the US Navy worked alongside the Royal Navy and it was decided to mount four 6-in/53 caliber guns in two twin gun turrets fore and aft and keep the eight guns in the tiered casemates so that she would have an eight gun broadside and, due to limited arcs of fire from the casemate guns, four to six guns firing fore or aft. Her secondary armament consisted of two /50 caliber anti-aircraft guns in single mounts. Detroit was initially built with the capacity to carry 224 mines, but these were removed early in her career to make way for more crew accommodations. She also carried two triple and two twin, above-water, torpedo tube mounts for  torpedoes. The triple mounts were fitted on either side of the upper deck, aft of the aircraft catapults, and the twin mounts were one deck lower on either side, covered by hatches in the side of the hull.

The ship lacked a full-length waterline armor belt. The deck over the machinery spaces and steering gear had a thickness of 1.5 inches. The gun turrets were not armored and only provided protection against muzzle blast and the conning tower had 1.5 inches of armor. Detroit carried two floatplanes aboard that were stored on the two catapults. Initially these were probably Vought VE-9s until the early 1930s when the ship may have operated OJ-2 until 1935 and Curtiss SOC Seagulls until 1940 when Vought OS2U Kingfishers were used on ships without hangars.

Armament changes
During her career Detroit went through several armament changes, some of these changes were to save weight, but others were to increase her AA armament. The lower torpedo tube mounts proved to be very wet and were removed, and the openings plated over, before the start of World War II. Another change made before the war was to increase the 3-inch guns to eight, all mounted in the ship's waist. After 1940, the lower aft 6-inch guns were removed and the casemates plated over for the same reason as the lower torpedo mounts, and in 1944, the upper fore 6-in guns were removed. The ship's anti-aircraft armament were augmented by five twin  Bofors guns along with 12  Oerlikon cannons by the end of the war.

Inter-war period
After a shakedown cruise to the Mediterranean, Detroit joined the Scouting Fleet for exercises and maneuvers along the east coast and in the Mediterranean. From September–October 1924, she was on lifeguard station for the USAAS's round-the-world flight, then served as flagship for Commander, Light Cruiser Divisions until 23 November. After overhaul at Boston, she sailed on 2 February 1925 for the west coast and fleet maneuvers along the coast and in Hawaiian waters. She returned to Boston on 10 July with the Scouting Fleet.

As flagship for Commander, Light Cruiser Division 3, from July 1925 to March 1926 and July to December 1926, Detroit continued to participate in maneuvers and fleet problems along the east coast and in the Caribbean. From March–April 1927, she patrolled off the coast of Nicaragua to protect American interests during political disturbances there.

Detroit sailed from Boston on 16 June as flagship for Commander, US Naval Forces in Europe. She made goodwill visits to various ports in Europe, North Africa, and the Middle East, and received official visits from the Kings of Norway, Denmark, and Spain, and the President of the Irish Free State. She also transported Secretary of State Frank B. Kellogg between Ireland and France for the talks which led the following year to the signing of the Kellogg-Briand Peace Pact.

The cruiser returned to Norfolk, Virginia, on 12 September 1928, for duty with the Scouting Fleet, serving as flagship for Commander, Light Cruiser Divisions, from 6 July 1929 to 29 September 1930. In January 1931, she sailed for a combined fleet problem off Balboa, then became flagship for Commander, Destroyer Squadrons, Battle Force on 19 March 1931, based on San Diego, California. In 1931, Captain Nathan Post was placed in command. Detroits operations included exercises along the west coast and maneuvers in Alaskan and Hawaiian waters. Except for a fleet problem in the Atlantic in 1934, she remained in the Pacific with the Battle Force, operating from her base at San Diego.

In 1941, Detroits home port became Pearl Harbor. The other two ships bore the brunt of an attack by six torpedo planes. Despite several strafing passes, Detroit was able to get underway safely and set up an anti-aircraft fire which accounted for several planes. Only one of Detroits crew members was injured during the Japanese attack, Lester Silva, who received a Purple Heart.

World War II
Returning to Pearl Harbor on 10 December, Detroit took up convoy escort duty between her home port and the West coast. In September 1942, Detroit escorted two convoys to Naval Station Tutuila in Pago Pago, American Samoa, rescuing the crew of a downed PBY Catalina during one passage.

Detroit sailed from San Francisco on 10 November 1942 for Kodiak, Alaska, to become flagship for Commander, Task Group 8.6 (TG 8.6), and patrol between Adak and Attu Islands to prevent further enemy penetration of the Aleutians. On 12 January 1943, she covered the unopposed landings made on Amchitka to gain a base from which to cut the Japanese Supply line, and after repairs at Bremerton from February–March, returned to patrol duty to intercept reinforcements trying to reach the Japanese garrisons on Kiska and Attu. In April, she bombarded Holtz Bay and Chichagof Harbor on Attu, returning the next month to join in the assault and capture of the island. In August, under the command of Captain H. G. Sickel, she took part in the bombardments of Kiska, then covered the landings of 15 August which revealed that the island had been secretly evacuated.

Detroit remained in Alaskan waters until 1944, operating with the covering group for the western Aleutian bases. In June, she saw action with Task Force 94 (TF 94) during the bombardment of shore installations in the Kuriles. She sailed from Adak on 25 June, and after repairs at Bremerton, arrived at Balboa, Panama on 9 August to serve as temporary flagship of the Southeast Pacific Force. She patrolled on the west coast of South America until December.

Clearing San Francisco on 16 January 1945, Detroit arrived at Ulithi on 4 February for duty with the 5th Fleet. She acted as flagship for the replenishment group serving the fast carrier task forces until the end of the war, and entered Tokyo Bay on 1 September. Detroit was one of two ships present at both Pearl Harbor on 7 December 1941 and the signing of the Japanese surrender (the other being ). Detroit continued to direct replenishment operations for the Occupation fleet and in addition, the repatriation of Japanese to the home islands from Pacific bases. She left Tokyo Bay on 15 October for the United States with returning servicemen on board, as part of Operation Magic Carpet.

Detroit was decommissioned at Philadelphia on 11 January 1946, and sold for scrap on 27 February.

Awards

 American Defense Service Medal with "FLEET" clasp
 American Campaign Medal
 Asiatic-Pacific Campaign Medal with six battle stars
 World War II Victory Medal
 Navy Occupation Service Medal

Legacy
Detroit Seamount of the Hawaiian-Emperor seamount chain is named after Detroit.

References

External links

 
USS Detroit, Report of Pearl Harbor Attack
2015.20 Mary Jane McKinven Collection
Naval History and Heritage Command photo collection USS Detroit

Omaha-class cruisers
Ships built in Quincy, Massachusetts
1922 ships
World War II cruisers of the United States
Ships present during the attack on Pearl Harbor
Ships of the Aleutian Islands campaign